Okhaldhunga District is one of 14 districts of Koshi Province in eastern Nepal.

Okhaldhunga is the place where Siddhicharan Shrestha was born. Siddhicharan Shrestha is known as the 'Yug Kawi' (Poet of the era) of Nepal. He is a famous poet of Nepal and is popular for his song and poem ‘Mero Pyaro Okhaldhunga’ (My dearly Okhaldhunga).

Geography and climate

Demographics
At the time of the 2011 Nepal census, Okhaldhunga District had a population of 147,984. Of these, 58.1% spoke Nepali, 9.2% Tamang, 9.0% Magar, 6.8% Sherpa, 4.8% Wambule, 3.8% Bahing, 2.1% Sunuwar, 1.9% Rai, 1.0% Jerung, 1.0% Newar, 0.5% Bhojpuri, 0.3% Thulung, 0.2% Gurung, 0.2% Maithili, 0.1% Bhujel, 0.1% Majhi and 0.2% others.

In terms of ethnicity/caste, 22.9% were Chhetri, 11.3% Magar, 10.6% Hill Brahmin, 10.0% Rai, 9.8% Tamang, 7.0% Sherpa, 6.6% Newar, 4.1% Kami, 3.3% Damai/Dholi, 3.0% Sunuwar, 2.9% Sarki, 2.1% Gharti/Bhujel, 1.6% Gurung, 1.5% Bahing, 0.7% Majhi, 0.7% Sanyasi/Dasnami, 0.5% Kanu, 0.3% Bin, 0.1% Badi, 0.1% Hajam/Thakur, 0.1% Thulung and 0.4% others.

In terms of religion, 70.8% were Hindu, 17.7% Buddhist, 10.2% Kirati, 0.9% Christian, 0.1% Prakriti and 0.3% others.

In terms of literacy, 64.1% could read and write, 2.8% could only read and 33.0% could neither read nor write.

Village Development Committees

The district contains the following VDCs from 2017:

Andheri Narayansthan,
Baksa,
Balakhu,
Barnalu,
Baruneshwor,
Betinee,
Bhadaure,
Bhussinga,
Bigutar,
Bilandu,
Chyanam,
Diyale,
Fediguth,
Fulbari,
Gamnangtar,
Harkapur,
Jantarkhani,
Jyamire,
Kalikadevi,
Khijikati,
Katunje,
Ketuke,
Khiji Chandeshwori,
Khijifalate,
Kuibhir,
Kuntadevi,
Madhavpur,
Mamkha,
Manebhanjyang,
Moli,
Mulkharka,
Narmedeshwor,
Okhaldhunga,
Palapu,
Patle,
Pokali,
Pokhare,
Prapcha,
Ragadip,
Ragani,
Raniban,
Ratmate,
Rawadolu,
Rumjatar,
Salleri,
Serna,
Shreechaur,
Singhadevi,
Sisneri,
Taluwa,
Tarkerabari,
Thakle,
Thoksela,
Thulachhap,
Ubu,
Yasam

Municipality
Siddhicharan Municipality
Champadevi Rural Municipality
Sunkoshi Rural Municipality
Likhu Rural Municipality
Chisankhugadhi Rural Municipality
Molung Rural Municipality
Khijidemba Rural Municipality
Manebhanjyang Rural Municipality

Tourist area

Tourists are attracted to the beauty of Khiji Okhaldhunga and Betinee Thuldhunga Okhaldhunga.

See also
Zones of Nepal

References

 

 
Districts of Nepal established during Rana regime or before
Districts of Koshi Province